is a Prefectural Natural Park in central Saga Prefecture, Japan. Established in 1970, the park spans the municipalities of Karatsu, Ogi, Saga, and Taku.

See also
 National Parks of Japan

References

Parks and gardens in Saga Prefecture
Protected areas established in 1970
1970 establishments in Japan